Lillico is a locality in West Gippsland, Victoria. At the 2016 census, it had a population of 86.

References

Towns in Victoria (Australia)
Shire of Baw Baw